The Wetzell-Archbold Farmstead is an historic stone and log farmhouse, located at 4437 Reservoir Road, Northwest, Washington, D.C., in the Foxhall neighborhood.

History
It was built by Lazarus Wetzell in 1843.
The home is listed on the National Register of Historic Places.

References

External links
WETZEL-ARCHBOLD FARMSTEAD SO #B-582/2852, Application for Subdivision in the Georgetown University DC Preservation Law repository

Houses on the National Register of Historic Places in Washington, D.C.
Houses completed in 1843
1843 establishments in the United States